Takáč is a Slovak occupational surname meaning "weaver". It may refer to:

 Dalibor Takáč (b. 1997), Slovak footballer
 Erik Takáč (b. 1975), Slovak footballer
 Ján Takáč (1909–1995), Czech long-distance runner
 Samuel Takáč (b. 1991), Slovak ice hockey player

See also
 Tkáč

Slovak-language surnames